Neotoxoptera formosana or the Onion aphid, is an aphid in the superfamily Aphidoidea in the order Hemiptera. It was originally discovered in Taiwan in 1921, but has spread all around the world. The aphid is dark reddish brown in color. Host plants include Allium ascalonicum, Allium cepa, Allium chinense, Allium fistulosum, Allium porrum, Allium sativum, Allium schoenoprasum, and Allium tuberosum.

The aphid is a carrier of garlic latent potyvirus and alstroemeria mosaic potyvirus.

References 

Insects of Taiwan
Insects described in 1921
Macrosiphini